Brighton High School is located in Brighton, which is part of Livingston County, Michigan, United States. BHS is part of the Brighton Area School system.

Academics 
BHS is ranked 2,022nd in America, 60th in Michigan, and 26th in the Detroit Metro Area. 49% of students participate in Advanced Placement courses with 40% of students passing at least 1 AP exam. According to state testing 57% of students are proficient in math, with 77% of students being proficient in reading. The graduation rate is 98%.

Athletics
Brighton High School is a member of the Michigan High School Athletic Association (MHSAA). Brighton has been part of the West Division of the Kensington Lakes Activities Association since 2008, when the Kensington Valley Conference merged with the Western Lakes Activities Association. The Brighton varsity football team became the first Livingston County team ever to advance to the state finals in the 2019 season.

Rugby 
Brighton's most recent championship was during the 2016 season when they took home the Michigan Youth Rugby Association (MYRA) Division II State Championship. As of 2017, there are 26 teams in the MYRA. Brighton won MYRA Division I State Championships in 2002 and 2006, and also won the MYRA Division II Championship in 2008.

Notable alumni
 Drew Henson, former NFL player (Dallas Cowboys, Minnesota Vikings, Detroit Lions) and  MLB player (New York Yankees)
Tim Alberta, Chief Political Correspondent for POLITICO, and former reporter for National Review, National Journal and The Wall Street Journal
 Frank A Buckless, Stephen P. Zelnak Jr. Dean at North Carolina State University’s Poole College of Management
 Tobin McDuff, Sportscaster, KFDX, Nexstar Media Group

References

External links

Public high schools in Michigan
Educational institutions established in 1966
Schools in Livingston County, Michigan
1966 establishments in Michigan